The 2000–01 New Jersey Devils season was the 27th season for the National Hockey League franchise that was established on June 11, 1974, and 19th season since the franchise relocated from Colorado prior to the 1982–83 NHL season. Although the Devils won the Atlantic Division and were Eastern Conference champions for the third time, the team fell short of winning back-to-back Stanley Cup championships, losing to the Colorado Avalanche in the Stanley Cup Finals series, four games to three.

Regular season
The Devils had a scoring finesse unseen since the 1993–94 squad; their 295 goals scored propelled them to the best offensive team in the NHL, as well as the top spot in the Eastern Conference. They had two 40-goal scorers in Patrik Elias and Alexander Mogilny, while Petr Sykora finished with an impressive 35 goals. On October 28 at Pittsburgh, the Devils won in a 9-0 rout that saw John Madden and Randy McKay each score four goals. Martin Brodeur, as in previous seasons, played strongly, finishing with 42 wins, a 2.32 goals against average (GAA) and nine shutouts. Defensively, the team was also strong; their 195 goals allowed were the second-fewest in the East. From February 26 to March 23, the team went on a 13-game winning streak.

Despite having the fewest power-play opportunities of all 30 League teams with 310, the Devils had the best power play percentage at 22.90% (71 for 310).

Season standings

Schedule and results

Playoffs
note that teams in bold were the winner of the game. Scores are listed winner-loser style, not away-home style

Eastern Conference Quarterfinals

Eastern Conference semifinals

Eastern Conference finals

Stanley Cup Finals

Season stats

Regular season
Scoring

Goaltending

Playoffs
Scoring

Goaltending

Note: GP = Games played; G = Goals; A = Assists; Pts = Points; +/- = Plus/minus; PIM = Penalty minutes; PPG = Power-play goals; SHG = Short-handed goals; GWG = Game-winning goals
      MIN = Minutes played; W = Wins; L = Losses; T/OT = Ties/overtime losses; GA = Goals against; GAA = Goals against average; SO = Shutouts; SA = Shots against; SV = Shots saved; SV% = Save percentage;

Awards and records

Awards

Nominations

Draft picks
The Devils' draft picks at the 2000 NHL Entry Draft at the Pengrowth Saddledome in Calgary, Alberta, Canada.

See also
2000–01 NHL season

Notes

References

 

New Jersey Devils seasons
New Jersey Devils
New Jersey Devils
New Jersey Devils
New Jersey Devils
New Jersey Devils
20th century in East Rutherford, New Jersey
21st century in East Rutherford, New Jersey
Eastern Conference (NHL) championship seasons
Meadowlands Sports Complex